is a Quasi-National Park on the coast of Yamaguchi Prefecture, Japan.

See also

 List of national parks of Japan

References

National parks of Japan
Parks and gardens in Yamaguchi Prefecture
Protected areas established in 1955
1955 establishments in Japan